VingCard Elsafe, whose origin was in Moss, Norway, is an international producer of hotel locking systems, electronic in-room safes and energy management systems. After inventing the first mechanical hole card operated lock in 1976, VingCard was acquired in 1994 by ASSA ABLOY, and merged with the electronic safe producer Elsafe to form VingCard Elsafe in 2006. Since 2015 VingCard Elsafe is not an operating company, but a product brand within ASSA ABLOY Global Solutions.

History

Founding of VingCard

The original VingCard lock was invented by Tor Sørnes, a Norwegian author, politician, and engineer. In 1950 Sørnes worked as a production planner at Christiania Staal & Jernvarefabrikk in Moss, Norway, a factory which made locks and ice skates under the brandname Ving. In 1955 he became the factory's machine constructor and when the factory in 1960—as one of the first in the country—established a department of research and development, he became its director.

In the late 1960s and through the 1970s, there were efforts in the security industry to create a room access system that would improve the security by replacing older keys.

In 1975 Tor Sørnes invented the VingCard lock, the first known mechanical hole card operated lock. Operated by a plastic key card with a pattern of holes, there were 32 possible hole locations, giving up to  different keys. The 32 holes in the key gave 4.3 billion combinations, the same number as the population of the earth at that time. The key could easily be changed for each new guest by inserting a new key template in the lock that matched the new key.

In 1979 Sørnes was working for TrioVing as an engineer in the R&D Department when a sister company of TrioVing was established – VingCard. This became the start of the company VingCard. Export of the original invention was initiated in 1978 when it was installed in the Peachtree Plaza Hotel in Atlanta, Georgia which was the world's tallest hotel at the time. The hotel had been troubled by burglaries and was eager to test the new security innovations. This original system was patented in 29 countries, and was a mechanical key card predecessor to the contemporary electronic room access card. The invention is still in worldwide hotel security use under the brand VingCard.

Founding of Elsafe
1979 was also the year that Elsafe (then a separate company) invented the world's first electronic in-room safe, introducing it to the hotel market. The new product was named Elsafe, and the company's first factory was placed in Mosvik, Norway. In 1980, Elsafe installed its first safe installation at a property in the Canary Islands, and it later began selling to hotels on all seven continents. Bjørn Lyng, Elsafe's founder, wanted to create a security vault that opened and closed electronically, and new electronic safes soon led to an industry-wide shift, where safes requiring metal keys increasingly became obsolete.

Dual acquisition by ASSA ABLOY

In 1992–93 VingCard launched the electronic magnetic stripe card lock to a positive market reception. Tor Sørnes continued as a vice president and director of R&D at VingCard, retiring in 1992. Following the merger in November 1994 between VingCard's former owners, Abloy Security, and the Swedish Securitas AB, VingCard became part of ASSA ABLOY, a Swedish lock manufacturer.

Elsafe also became part of the ASSA ABLOY Group in 1994, currently the world's largest independent lock group company, which is composed of more than 100 subsidiary international companies. Aside from VingCard Elsafe, ASSA ABLOY also owns Yale lock, Sargent and the high-security lock firms of Medeco in the U.S., Mul-T-Lock in Israel, Fichet-Bauche in France. It is controlled by Gustaf Douglas through his company Latour. It has distributors located in over 167 countries.

Merger
In 1997, VingCard and Elsafe joined marketing and sales forces and then finally merged to form VingCard Elsafe in 2006. As a single entity, the company counts more than 166 sales offices worldwide. Among its current product focuses are RFID technology and energy management systems.

In 2015 VingCard Elsafe was subsumed by ASSA ABLOY Global Solutions.

Executives
Tim Shea operated as the global president of VingCard Elsafe from 2004 and later ASSA ABLOY Hospitality until 2015. Since 2016 the global president of Assa Abloy Hospitality is Christophe Sut, also Executive Vice President of Assa Abloy. In North America, VingCard Elsafe operated under Tim Shea as acting president from the departure of Bill Oliver in October 2014. As of March 2015 Lihong Wu took over responsibilities as president of Assa Abloy Hospitality North America.

Marc Tobias has been granted several patents regarding bypass tools and techniques for opening or protecting locks, including 5,355,701 VINGCARD.

Products

VingCard locking systems
Original  – this lock series has the same physical design as VingCard's more advanced locks, and requires no front desk equipment, batteries or software.
Classic  – user-friendly easy to operate, available with either a magnetic strip (magstripe) card reader, or with optional dual magnetic lock/smart card ability.
Classic RFID  – if a facility already has VingCard classic locks installed, Classic RFID adds the ability to go "contactless." Marketed as particularly flexible in regard to future developments.
Signature  – blends with a hotel's particular interior, for interior design needs. Signature is available in two design formats: Signature Trend, for modern hotels, and Signature Décor, for hotels with a classic style.
Signature RFID  – their most recent system, marketed as utilizing the most recent RFID technology.
Essence  – Essence houses all locking components within a door, allowing for minimalistic interior design.
Allure  – Allure places all hardware inside the walls, and the system's panels are fully customizable to match the surrounding design.

Elsafe safes
Xtra II On-Wall – intended for hotels with limited space, the Xtra II On-Wall Safe is designed to fit on all cupboard, armoire or closet walls, or guestroom wall. It meets the same security standards and uses the same electronic platform as all Xtra II series safes.
Xtra II Floor – intended to secure larger items including briefcases, laptops and other electronic equipment.
Xtra II - The Xtra II series includes an audit trail system and Elsafe's handheld SafeLink controller. Constructed with solid steel, a proprietary quick-change battery system and anti-tamper mechanisms.
Zenith - the Zenith safe requires minimal space, and can be placed in drawers or cabinets. Zenith has space for laptops and tablet devices, and also has an anti-tamper security switch and RF-online upgradeability.
Sentinel II - UL-1037 certified safe with an interlocking deadbolt system, anti-tamper labyrinths, extended solid steel bolt hinges, and a one-piece cold-pressed steel door. Sentinel II RFID lets users open and secure their in-room safe with the Signature RFID hotel lock room key.
Infinity II - with same security features as the Sentinel II, it has a sleek design and a backlit keypad (digital only).

Visionline by VingCard
Introduced in 2006, Visionline is wireless locking technology developed by VingCard Elsafe. It uses radio frequency (RF Online) to operate stand-alone electronic locks. The system's radio frequency is one of the first to be based on Zigbee technology, a secured wireless open platform.

Visionline eliminates the need for hotel staff to visit guestrooms when identifying locks with low batteries or reprogramming individual locks, and lets guests request a room change or extended stay without visiting the front desk. Visionline also gives live remote reports on which items in a room require maintenance.

Orion by VingCard Elsafe
Orion by VingCard Elsafe is an energy management system that tracks energy usage at a property, by combining digital thermostats, occupancy sensors, door position interfaces, remote server software and a dashboard reporting system. Orion is marketed for hotels, and the room control dashboard gives an overview of guestroom electronic systems, including occupancy status, locks, safes, lighting and total energy consumption.

Orion can control a room's ambient temperature when guestrooms are unoccupied, and automatically resume the preset when the guest returns. Orion also can interface with a hotel's property management system to pre-condition rooms when guests check in, and can automatically set the energy-saving mode when guests check out.

Orion won the Star Award from Top Hotel in 2012.

Affiliations
VingCard Elsafe and its executives are part of the following professional and industry organizations:
AHLA
Hospitality Technology Next Generation (HTNG)
 AAHOA – Founding Members
American Resort Development Association (ARDA)

See also

References

External links
VingcardElsafe.com
assaabloyglobalsolutions.com

Further reading

Manufacturing companies of Norway
Electronics companies established in 2006
Norwegian companies established in 2006
2015 disestablishments in Norway
Electronics companies disestablished in 2015